Endzeit Bunkertracks is an aggrotech/electro-industrial compilation album series featuring exclusive, deleted and/or hard-to-find tracks. The first volume, or "act", (released 21 March 2005 by the record label Alfa Matrix) consists of 60 tracks, 50 of them being exclusive. Endzeit Bunkertracks follows a style where the album is divided into four "sessions": Evil, Torture, Damage and Death. The second act was released on 11 May 2006, and the third on 26 November 2007. All three came in 4-CD boxes, limited to 1, 666 copies. The fourth volume was released on 13 February 2009.

Endzeit Bunkertracks: Act I

Endzeit Bunkertracks: Act I peaked at #1 on the German Alternative Charts (DAC) and ranked #14 on the DAC Top Albums of 2005.

Evil Session

Shnarph! – Reden und Atmen (Kurz)
Hocico – Born to be [Hated] (Original Odium)
Glis – Disappear! (Noir Machine Mix)
Headscan – Dead Silver Sky (Biometric)
Mnemonic – Humiliation (Club Mix)
C-Drone-Defect – Fashion Victim (Just Greed Version)
Noisuf-X – Happy Birthday
Ayria – My Revenge on the World
Hioctan – Dogma
Plastic Noise Experience – Rotten People
Pail – Que Hable el Silencio
Punto Omega – Punto Omega (Run Level Zero Mix)
Die Sektor – Scraping the Flesh (Alternate Mix)
Cyclone B – Razor
Neon Cage Experiment – Surrender (1.0)

Torture Session

Suicide Commando – Cause of Death: Suicide (Club Edit)
Skoyz – Distress/Signal (Vision Mix by Infekktion)
Virtual><Embrace – Dark Room
Combichrist – Tractor
Neikka RPM – Storm of Hell (Complete the Fear)
[:SITD:] – Lebensborn (Autoaggression Mix)
Sero.Overdose – Wir (Suicide Commando Mix)
Assemblage 23 – Infinite (Glis Mix)
XP8 – Straight Down (Dunkelwerk Mix)
Diskonnekted – Danger (Aggressive Mix)
Aslan Faction – Weep for Me (Auspex Mix)
sang.ræl – A Brighter Day
!AïBoFoRcEn<- featuring à;GRUMH... – Chaos - Insect (Bloody Mix)
Fractured – Only Human Remains
Winterstahl – Delusion

Damage Session

Tamtrum – Le Son de la Pluie
Implant – Drugs vs. Violence (C-Drone-Defect Mix)
Run Level Zero – Unter the Gun (Cal .50 Remix by X-Fusion)
God Module – Resurrection Resurrected (Livevil Version)
X-Fusion – C'mon Devil (Slow Version)
Nebula-H featuring Aluben – Hypnos vs F.K.
Terrorfakt – A.L.F. (accessory Mix)
S.I.N.A. – Glamourboy
Dunkelwerk – Hope's Heaven (Short Cut)
Grendel – Soilbleed (v.2)
Diverje – Enough to Destroy
Tactical Sekt – Awaken the Ghost (1st Awakening Edit)
Noise Process – Ascend
MinDecease – Despair (Infected Mix)
Project-X – Lies 2k2 (Punto Omega Remix)

Death Session

yelworC – Doom of Choronzon
The Retrosic – New World Order
Agonoize – Sick
Lok-8 – Defy (Edit)
Wumpscut – The March of the Dead
Re Agent – Heaven Falling (Rapid Descent Mix)
FGFC820 – Existence
Dive – Heart and Soul
Unter Null – Sick Fuck
Dioxyde – Invasive Therapy
Preemptive Strike 0.1 – Lethal Defence Systems
Stark – Medicine (Doctors and Nurses Mix)
Derma-Tek – Lost Cause (Grendel Mix)
Synaptic Defect – Wake Up!
Agonised by Love – After Dark (She Came) (Glis Mix)

Endzeit Bunkertracks: Act II

Endzeit Bunkertracks: Act II peaked at #2 on the German Alternative Charts (DAC) and ranked #9 on the DAC Top Albums of 2006.

Evil Session

The Retrosic – The Storm
X-Fusion – Witness of Your Decease
Glis – Dead Set [7 AM]
Soman – Ruler
Monolith – 50360329
T.H. Industry – Die Wut
I:Scintilla – Havestar (CombiChrist Mix)
Noisuf-X – Jezebel (BT-Mix)
<endif> – Sleeper Cell
Stray – Intoxicate
Kobold – Rubicon
Neikka RPM featuring Implant – Find a Way
Die Sektor – Mother Hunger
Diskonnekted featuring Johan van Roy – Religion (Mildreda Mix)
Dioxyde – Words of Judas (Supreme Court Mix)
Winterstahl – Self Deception (Hard Version)

Torture Session

Negri Bodies – I.T.D.
Suicide Commando – Bleed for Us All (unter Null Mix)
Heimatærde – Gib Mir
Inure – Subversive (Corrupted Re-Edit)
Necro Facility – Downstairs
Mentallo and the Fixer – Driving off a Cliff with a Cult (An Old Friend Nearly Killed Me Mix)
Index AI – Butterfly Houses (Edit 2)
FÏX8:SËD8 – Monolith
Alien Produkt – Acceso Denegado (Vigilante Mix)
Klutæ – We are Sinners (Made in Denmark Mix)
Distorted Memory – God's Wrath
Dunkelwerk – Dresden (Reduced)
Modulate – Das Bunker
Shnarph! – Ausgebrannt
Tactical Sekt – Beslan
Retractor – Possessions (Dawn of Ashes Mix)

Damage Session
Necrotek – Spectre
Skalpell – Sanatorium
C/A/T – Smashed
S.I.N.A. – Bewegungsablauf (Floor 4 Version)
Isis Signum featuring Neikka RPM – Technique (Club Mix)
Zombie Girl – Creepy Crawler
Die Form – Bite of God 2006
Plastic Noise Experience – I Feel Love (7”)
Headscan – Terra Incognita (Sojourn)
Wumpscut – Jesus Antichristus (Cerebral Apoplexy Mix)
Life Cried – As We Decay
E.S.R. – Nothing Stays
FGFC820 – Pray
Thirteenth Exile – Diseasespreader (Filthy Bitch Mix)
Leæther Strip – Slam (The Happy Dance Version)
Orange Sector – Tanzbefehl (Urban Remix by Heimatærde)

Death Session

Neue Weltumfassende Resistance – Drache und Baum
Implant featuring Unter Null – You Push Me
Caustic – Digital Mangina
Reaper – Angst
Carnivora – Motivation for the Unseen Things
Revolution State – Deny
Tamtrum – La Menthe Vénéneuse
Iambia – Chaosmancer (6,66 Mix by Noid of Siva Six)
Terror Punk Syndicate – Dysmorphia
Inertia – Slow Motion (Aslan Faction Mix)
sang.ræl – Prophetic
Trial – Für Zwei (Bunker Mix)
Morphine Shot – My Legions
Unter Null – Sick Fuck (Aesthetic Perfection Mix)
Lujhboia – Looser's Letter (Ammonium Remix)
Dawn of Ashes – The Suffering

Endzeit Bunkertracks: Act III

Evil Session

Nachtmahr – Boom Boom Boom
Noisuf-X – Hit Me Hard (As Hard as You Can Mix)
Krzon. – Dead or Alive
Kombat Unit – We are Machines (Rumble Remix by Soman)
Leæther Strip – Battleground 07 (Rumsfeld Mix)
Wynardtage – Praise the Fallen (Acylum Mix)
Uberbyte – Total War
Cylab – Dented Halo (Panel Beaten Remix by Skinjob)
Acretongue – Estranged
Helalyn Flowers – E-Race Generation (Angelspit Mix)
The Judas Coven – Burn Your Soul
Modulate – Sullfuck
Caustic – Mmm Papscraper I Love You (Cervello Elettronico Mix)
Neikka RPM – Umbrae Sub Noctem (Endzeit Mix)
Angels On Acid – Misery Loves Company
Unter Null – Journey (V1)

Torture Session

Faderhead – Dirtygirrrls / Dirtybois (Modulate Mix)
Soman – Mask
SAM – Arm of Justice (Rough Mix)
Implant – There is a Riot Going On
Grendel – Hate This (X-Fusion Mix)
Suicide Commando – Hate Me (Leæther Strip Mix)
FGFC820 – Anthem (Steinkind Mix)
Dunkelwerk –  Ungethuem (Edit)
Trimetrick – Bitch from Hell (DJ1)
Skoyz – Distress Signal (C-Drone-Defect Mix)
Painbastard – Nyctophobia (Straftanz Mix)
Essence of Mind – Different
FabrikC – Exorcism
Detune X – Pure Evil (Hardbeat Mix)
C/A/T – Enhancer (Cervello Elettronico Mix)
Banister – Taste of Flesh

Damage Session

Radium226 – Nuclear Violation
Prototype – I Hate You
Acylum – Rape (Exclusive Edit)
Endif vs. Replogen – Last Tribe
Complex Mind – Infiltrat
Sebastian Komor – Das Oontz
Shnarph! – Virus
Experiment Haywire – Game Called Life
Splatter Squall – Shadows
[:SITD:] – Stammheim (Edit)
Ayria – The Gun Song (Essence of Mind Mix)
X-Fusion – Rotten to the Core (Solitary Experiments Remix)
32Crash – Lone Ranger (C-Drone-Defect Mix)
Monolith – All Over (Ah Cama-Sotz Mix)
Cervello Elettronico – Plastic Face
X-Rx – No More Room in Hell
Virgins O.R. Pigeons – Existe – (Violated Virgin Remix)

Death Session

Skinjob – Man (Mothers Against Noise)
Schallfaktor – Menschen
Stahlfrequenz – Nothing but a Mashine
Alter Der Ruine – Coppin' it Sweet (Noisuf-X Mix)
Propulsion – Extreme
Diskonnekted – Adrenaline (Endzeit Edit)
Dawn of Ashes – Still Born Defect (Nemesis Mix)
Vision Anomaly feat. Stahlnebel - Anxiety Neuroses
De Tot Cor – Strawberry Panic
Terrorfakt – Skullfucker (Synnack Mix)
Individual Totem – WWW
Inure – The Offering
Chaoskult – Numb
C-Drone-Defect – Morituri te Salutant
Noisex – Das ist Elektro
Psy'Aviah – Mine (Endzeit Mix)
Isis Signum feat. Sara Noxx – Destroy the Wall (Supreme Court Remix)

Endzeit Bunkertracks: Act IV

Evil Session
 Faderhead – TZDV
 Nachtmahr – I Believe in Blood
 X-Rx – Die Sexualkiste der Hölle
 Alter Der Ruine – Relax and Ride It (Handlebar Mix by Memmaker) *
 Aetherfx – Leaving Hope *
 The Synthetic Dream Foundation – Blood Divine *
 Cyclone B – Human Progress *
 Mesmer's Eyes – Judgement Day *
 Wynardtage – Tragic Hero (X-Fusion Mix) *
 Virgins O.R Pigeons – Born in Sin (DJ Psycon Mix) *
 IC 434 – Back to Back (Endzeit Mix) *
 Uberbyte – Last Human *
 Angels On Acid – Now You Know *
 Alien Produkt – Virus *
 Kant Kino – We are Kant Kino *
 Stahlnebel vs Black Selket – Unsichtbar *
 Skorbut - Phantom Pain *

Torture Session
 Komor Kommando – Triggerfinger *
 SAM – World of Shit
 Phosgore – Pain Tutorial (Advanced Agony Mix) *
 Siva Six – Deep Black Will (Noisuf-X Mix)
 ReAdjust with Stahlnebel vs Black Selket - Supernatural Ability *
 Deathgression – Degenerated *
 PreEmptive Strike 0.1 – Ichthyic Ascension (Acylum Mix) *
 Dunkelwerk – Harkers Verderben (Short Cut) *
 Kobold – Blowback (Untermenschen) *
 Fractured – Nothing *
 Hivepolitiks – Wake Up *
 @VX feat. mind.in.a.box – Transformation *
 E-Thik – Schleichfahrt *
 Isis Signum feat. Sara Noxx – Energy (Supreme Court Mix) *
 Diskonnekted – Adrenaline (XP8 Mix) **
 Detroit Diesel – When Darkness Falls *
 Menschdefekt with Stahlnebel vs Black Selket – Stalingrad *

Damage Session
 Acretongue – Voyeur *
 Psy'Aviah feat. Leæther Strip – Sweetheart Revenge (Endzeit Mix) *
 Patenbrigade: Wolff – Stalinallee (Jugendklub Mix) *
 Industriegebiet – Sex Mit Einer Leiche (Soman Rmx)
 Noisuf-X – Last Dance *
 Modulate – Hard And Dirty (SAM Mix) *
 Novastorm – Blow Job
 Acylum – Schmerzpervers *
 Unter Null – Broken Heart Cliché *
 Schwarzblut – Muss Es Eine Trennung Geben *
 Plastic Noise Experience – Zu Nah (Suicide Commando Mix)
 Angelspit – Girl Poison (I:Scintilla Mix) *
 Essence Of Mind – Nightmare *
 Zombie Girl – The Darkness (Komor Kommando Mix) *
 Punto Omega – Fabricantes De Miedo *
 FGFC820 – The Heart Of America (Mesmer's Eyes Mix) *
 Krystal System – I Love My Chains (Mesmer's Eyes Mix) *

Death Session
 Memmaker – Death Comes (Rotersand Mix) *
 Ex.Es – Access To The Ex.Es (Pure Adrenaline Mix) *
 Shaun F – Drty Fckn Dsko (Hard Version) *
 Shaolyn – Face Down *
 Monolith – Attack Of The Ants *
 SHNARPH! – Eine Tolle Predigt
 C-Drone-Defect – Mundus Vult Decipi *
 Afterparty – Manbaby *
 Heimatærde – Vater (Aura Lussus Mixtura)
 Straftanz – Tanzt Kaputt, Was Euch Kaputt Macht! (Straftanz Original)
 Diffuzion – Fire (EFF DST Rmx) **
 Cylab – Dragonfly Dream *
 L'Âme Immortelle – Es Tut Mir Leid (Entschuldigung Mix By Grendel) **
 Leæther Strip – Cast Away 09 (Twenty Mix) *
 Neikka RPM feat. Leæther Strip – Warped (Terror Mix) *
 Retractor – Annihilation (Preemptive Strike 0.1 Remix) *
 Dym – Government Stomp! (Overplayed Remix) *

Endzeit Bunkertracks: Act V

Disc 1 [evil]
 Captive Six - Noizemaker (Edit) *
 Suicide Commando - Die Motherfucker Die (Modulate Mix) *
 Studio-X - To Hell *
 Shaolyn - More Bass in All Frequencies *
 Ex.Es - Orgasmofobia (Edit) *
 Freakangel - God’s Blind Game (Edit) *
 Mordacious - Unknown *
 Deadcibel - One of 47 *
 amGod - On the Hunt (Short Mix) *
 Industriegebiet - Erniedrigung *
 Alien Vampires - Evil Will Always Find U *
 SAM - Bull Fucking Shit *
 Xperiment - Inside the Flesh *
 Larva - Come with Me *
 Dolls of Pain - Addiction (Endzeit Version) *
 Stahlnebel vs. Black Selket - Sick *
 Centhron - Amok *

Disc 2 [torture]
 Virgins O.R Pigeons Gotta Get Mad *
 Armageddon Dildos House of Pain (Freakangel Mix) *
 Combichrist All Pain is Gone
 Nachtmahr War On The Dancefloor
 Menschdefekt Psycho Bitch *
 Terrorfrequenz Virus Wut (Endzeit Version) *
 De Tot Cor Mädchenliebe *
 iVardensphere Sentient Wave Form *
 Experiment Haywire Mean Enough Hot Enough (Studio-X Mix) *
 Diffuzion C.S. *
 Beati Mortui Soulreaper *
 Uberbyte Dein Himmel *
 Leæther Strip Compassion (Kant Kino Mix) *
 Siva Six vs. Iambia 299 Hits (Fucking Shite Mix) *
 Aiboforcen feat. Acylum Blood in Your Face *
 My Life with the Thrill Kill Kult Death Threat (Bahntier Mix) *
 The Ludovico Technique This Life *

Disc 3 [damage]
 R.I.P. (Roppongi Inc. Project) Temporary Evacuation 27.04.86 *
 Xykogen Mthrfkr *
 Sonic Introversion Please Yourself *
 Cervello Elettronico Player (Euromix) *
 [:SITD:] Rot (SAM Remix) *
 Unter Null I Can’t be the One (Ex.Es Mix) *
 Pouppee Fabrikk Symptom (Hard Cut Mix) *
 Ayria Bad List (Freakangel Mix) *
 Wynardtage Mask (Sleetgrout Endzeit Mix) *
 X-Fusion House of Mirrors
 C/A/T Live with Myself (Edit) *
 Acylum Raise Your Fist (Bunker Edit) *
 Schwarzblut Das Mandat *
 Das Ich Das Bunkerlied *
 Heimataerde Mutter **
 Suono Monster *
 Extize Hellektrostar (Reaper Mix) **

Disc 4 [death]
 Mesmer’s Eyes 1747 *
 The Chemical Sweet Kid Tears of Blood *
 Formalin Yuppiescum *
 Feindflug Ersatzteil **
 Dunkelwerk Croatoan (Very Short Cut) **
 Syndika:Zero Metaphor (Endzeit) *
 Haushetaere Sunshine is my Destroyer *
 Trimetrick Black Elektro *
 Noisuf-X White Noise (Bunker Edit) *
 Antythesys Suicide Music *
 Neikka RPM Warped (Endzeit Attack) *
 Katastroslavia Completely Normal *
 Plasmodivm Hypocrisy is Under Control (2.0) *
 Psy'Aviah Anger Management (Endzeit Edit) *
 Grendel Chemicals & Circuitry (Komor Kommando Mix)
 Kant Kino Stille! *
 Epinephrin Energie *

External links
Alfa Matrix

References

Electronica compilation albums
Industrial compilation albums
Compilation album series